Pack Up Your Troubles is a 1932 pre-Code Laurel and Hardy film directed by George Marshall and Raymond McCarey, named after the World War I song "Pack Up Your Troubles in Your Old Kit-Bag, and Smile, Smile, Smile". It is the team's second feature-length film.

Plot
In 1917, Stan and Ollie are drafted into the American Expeditionary Force to fight in World War I. Their ineptitude during basic training antagonizes the drill sergeant and they are assigned to kitchen duties. When they ask the cook where they should put the garbage cans he sarcastically tells them to take them to the general. They take him at his word and put them in the general's private dining room. The cook, who is thrown in the stockade with them, curses their "snitching" and threatens them with violence after they are released. They escape his wrath when they are shipped to the trenches in France.

Serving close to the front line, they befriend soldier Eddie Smith, who received a Dear John letter from his wife before shipping out. When Eddie is killed in action, the boys determine to rescue Eddie's daughter from her brutal foster father and deliver her to Eddie's parents, with whom he was estranged. Meanwhile they distinguish themselves in combat by losing control of a tank and accidentally forcing a German platoon into the open.

After the Armistice, Stan and Ollie venture to New York City to retrieve the girl and look for Eddie's parents. Using the city telephone directory, the task proves both monumental and problematic (Smith being the most common surname) as the boys blindly attempt to visit each Smith until they find the grandparents. After taking punches from an annoyed prizefighter and disrupting a society wedding, they resort to telephoning first.

While operating their lunch wagon, the boys are approached by an unpleasant civil servant who demands Eddie's child so that she can be placed in an orphanage. The boys refuse, and the man says he will return with the police to have the boys arrested.

They try to secure a loan with their lunch wagon to finance their escape to another city, but the banker says that he'd have to be unconscious to make such a deal. While laughing, he topples a bust onto his own head and knocks himself out. Taking this as approval, the boys take what they need from the bank vault.

Tailed to their apartment by the police, the boys unsuccessfully try to hide Eddie's daughter in a dumbwaiter. The police bring the three of them to the banker for identification, but when they turn out their pockets the banker's wife finds a photograph of Stan and Ollie with Eddie and recognizes him as her own son. The banker is the Smith they have been seeking all along! On learning that the little girl is his granddaughter, the banker drops the charges and invites them as his guests for dinner. The cook storms out of the kitchen to tell his boss that he will not adjust the service on a moment's notice, and recognizes Laurel and Hardy as the "snitches". The cook chases them away with a large kitchen knife.

Cast
 Stan Laurel as Stan
 Oliver Hardy as Ollie
 Don Dillaway as Eddie Smith
 Jacquie Lyn as Eddie's Baby
 Mary Carr as Old Woman With Letter
 James Finlayson as General
 Richard Cramer as Uncle Jack
 Adele Watson as Annie
 Tom Kennedy as Recruiting Sergeant
 Charles Middleton as Welfare Assistance Officer
 Richard Tucker as Mr. Smith Sr
 Muriel Evans as Wrong Eddie's Bride
 Grady Sutton as The Wrong Eddie
 C. Montague Shaw as Wrong Eddie's Father
 Billy Gilbert as Mr. Hathaway
 Charley Rogers as Rogers
 George Marshall as Pierre (uncredited)

Production

References

External links

 
 
 
 
 
 Spanish lobby poster(archived)

1932 films
1930s war comedy films
American war comedy films
American black-and-white films
Films directed by George Marshall
Films directed by Ray McCarey
Laurel and Hardy (film series)
Metro-Goldwyn-Mayer films
Military humor in film
Western Front (World War I) films
Films about the United States Army
1932 comedy films
1930s English-language films
1930s American films